A butt plug is a sex toy that is designed to be inserted into the rectum for sexual pleasure. They are similar to a dildo in some ways but tend to be shorter and have a flanged end to prevent the device from being lost inside the rectum.

History
Rectal dilators were originally designed for therapeutic uses and later marketed with terms such as Dr. Young's Ideal Rectal Dilators, which were marketed as a cure for insanity and constipation. In the late 20th century, similar devices started to be marketed as sex toys.

Basics
Unlike the vagina, which is closed off by the cervix, the rectum leads to the sigmoid colon. Objects that are inserted into the rectum can therefore potentially travel up into the bowel; the flared end on a butt plug exists to prevent this. Some dildos lack a flared end, and thus it is ill-advised to use such dildos anally since they may get stuck; rectal foreign bodies may require medical extraction.

In addition, the lower bowel above the rectum is easily perforated. For this reason, butt plugs tend to be shorter than dildos, and their marked size generally indicates the circumference of the device rather than the length. They must also be very smooth to avoid damaging the rectum or bowel. In order to get them into the rectum, they most commonly have a general profile of a round-ended cone which then narrows to a "waist" which locates itself at the anal sphincter, with the flared part outside the body, preventing the butt plug from slipping further into the body. The sphincter muscle will hold the plug in place by the waist, preventing the plug from slipping out unintentionally.

Butt plugs can be moved in or out for pleasure, so as to simulate the rhythmic thrusting of penetrative sex, although some butt plugs are specifically designed for stimulation of the prostate.

As with other activities involving anal penetration, such as anal sex, large amounts of sexual lubricant and a slow gentle approach are needed to insert or remove a butt plug.

Butt plugs are sometimes covered by condoms for hygiene and to allow for the easy disposal of any feces with which they may come into contact. Nevertheless, they should not be shared with other people, due to the risk of transmitting sexually transmitted infections, including HIV, from the transfer of body fluids from one person to another.

Designs
Butt plugs come in a variety of colors, shapes, sizes, and textures. Some are designed to look like penises, while some are ribbed or wavy. Many have a thin tip which is wider in the middle, a notch to hold it in place once it is inserted, and a flared base to prevent complete insertion into the rectum. Some plugs have an egg-shaped penetrative part. Some plugs are designed (long, flexible and curved) to penetrate the sigmoid colon.

Butt plugs are made of a variety of materials, the most common being latex. Other materials used include silicone, neoprene, wood, metal, glass, stone, and many other materials. Silicone is a particularly good material, as it can be disinfected in boiling water.

Fetish plugs
Fetish plugs are any kind of butt plugs that are designed in a way to be unusual, exciting, or unique in some way. A fetish plug is called such because it caters to sexual fetishes. One common type of fetish plug has a tail of long hair or synthetic fur attached to the non-insertable end so that, when inserted, the impression is given that the wearer has an animal's tail. Some plugs popular in animal roleplay have their tails molded from medical grade silicone as opposed to faux fur. The firmness of the silicone, when combined with bodily movements or rhythmic pelvic-floor muscle contractions, allow for a simulated tail "wag". There are also vibrating plugs and plugs which utilize erotic electro-stimulation.. Additional variations include plugs that can "ejaculate" by squirting water or other fluids such as lubricant, oil, etc., into the rectum, and inflatable plugs (intended to expand the rectum).

Risks

Sex toys that are used in the anus can easily get lost as rectal muscles contract and can suck an object up and up, potentially obstructing the colon; to prevent this from occurring, it is recommended that individuals use sex toys with a flared base or a string. However, the flared flange is not a foolproof method of preventing the plug from entering the rectum completely with the inability to retrieve it. This is uncomfortable and may require medical intervention. Butt plugs of excess diameter can, especially when inserted too rapidly and/or too forcefully, lead to sphincter tear, detachment or other rectal failure. Kegel exercises can help maintain normal, healthy sphincter function. When inserting a butt plug, one should be gentle, use plenty of lubrication, start with smaller sizes, and exercise patience. While medical data is sparse, some recommend not leaving a butt plug inserted for longer than two to three hours, though anecdotal evidence dictates some users wear their plugs for even longer; some committed practitioners only remove them so as to be able to pass stool.

In culture 

The sculpture named Santa Claus or the Buttplug Gnome was erected in Rotterdam, Netherlands, by Paul McCarthy.

See also

Anal beads
Anal masturbation
Rectal foreign body

References

Further reading

External links
 

Anal sex toys